Pralungo is a comune (municipality) in the Province of Biella in the Italian region Piedmont, located about  northeast of Turin and just north of Biella.

The municipality of Pralungo contains the frazioni (subdivisions, mainly villages and hamlets) Valle and Sant'Eurosia.

Pralungo borders the following municipalities: Biella, Sagliano Micca, Tollegno.

References

Cities and towns in Piedmont